Farsiyeh (also Romanized as Farsīyeh and Fersīyeh; also known as Farsiya) is a village in Tarrah Rural District, Hamidiyeh District, Ahvaz County, Khuzestan Province, Iran. At the 2006 census, its population was 248, in 41 families.

References 

Populated places in Ahvaz County